The 2014 Barnet Borough Council election took place on 22 May 2014 to elect members of Barnet Council in England. It took place on the same day as other local elections and it resulted in the Conservative Party holding on to overall control of the council.

Background
Before the election the Conservatives ran the council with 38 seats, compared to 22 for Labour and 3 for the Liberal Democrats. A total of 247 candidates stood in the election including a full slate of 63 each from the Conservative, Labour and Liberal Democrat parties. The Green Party stood 43 candidates, while there were 9 candidates from UKIP, 5 Independents and 1 from Left Unity. Following the death of Green Party candidate Jessica Yorke, the poll for Colindale ward was cancelled on 19 May and rescheduled to take place on 26 June.

Election result

|}

Results for Colindale included in table.

Ward results

Brunswick Park

Burnt Oak

Childs Hill

Colindale (delayed election)

Coppetts

East Barnet

East Finchley

Edgware

Finchley Church End

Garden Suburb

Golders Green

Hale

Hendon

High Barnet

Mill Hill

Oakleigh

Totteridge

Underhill

West Finchley

West Hendon

Woodhouse

By-elections between 2014 and 2018

Underhill

The by-election was called following the resignation of Cllr. Amy Trevethan.

References

2014 London Borough council elections
2014